Wakool River, an anabranch of the Edward River that is part of the Murray River catchment within the Murray–Darling basin, is located in the western Riverina region of south western New South Wales, Australia.

The Wakool River splits from the Edward River (itself an anabranch of the Murray) near Deniliquin, and flows generally to the west, southwest, northwest, and then west, joined by eleven minor tributaries, including the Niemur River. The Wakool is rejoined by the Edward River near Kyalite, not far from where it runs back into the main channel of the Murray, at Wakool Junction; dropping  over the course of its  length.

See also

 Rivers of New South Wales
 Gee Gee Bridge over Wakool River

References

External links

 

Tributaries of the Murray River
Rivers in the Riverina